The 2011 Liga Indonesia Premier Division Final is a scheduled football match played on 8 July 2012 at the Manahan Stadium in Surakarta, Indonesia, to determine the winner of 2011–12 Liga Indonesia Premier Division.

PS Barito Putera took the title after defeating Persita Tangerang in the final with a score of 2–1. This was their first premier division title.

Route to the Final

Match

References 

Final
2012